Susann Müller (born 26 May 1988) is a Retired German handball player and coach and trains the women's team of Füchse Berlin.

On club level, Müller played for a number of top teams across Europe, winning league titles in Denmark, Germany and Slovenia. A German international since her youth, she was bronze medalist at the 2007 World Championship and won the Junior World Championship title in 2008. A prolific left-handed shooter, Müller was the top scorer of the 2013 World Championship and was selected in the All-Star team of the tournament. With her performances, she also earned the Handballer of the Year title in Germany in 2013.

Career

Club
Müller began to play handball at the age of seven by local club 1.SSV Saalfeld, before in 2003 she switched to Bundesliga club HC Leipzig. Initially, she was part of the youth section of the club and was promoted to the senior team for the 2006–2007 Bundesliga season. She scored over 60 goals in the first part of the season, whereupon she got a contract extension until 2010. During her spell at the club, Müller won two league and two national cup titles, as well as the German Supercup title in 2008.

In 2010, Müller signed to Danish club SK Århus to be closer to her partner Nina Wörz, who played for Randers HK that time. However, due to Århus' financial difficulties Müller left the club after one season and eventually joined Randers HK. In the 2011–12 season, she led Randers to Danish league title, being the club's top scorer with 124 goals. In the following year, she moved to Slovenia to play for RK Krim, but she returned to Leipzig at the end of the season. Müller's second spell at the club lasted for one year, during which period she collected another silverware by winning the German Cup. In the summer of 2014, she was signed by Hungarian top club Győri ETO KC as a replacement for Katarina Bulatović. However, she and the club terminated her contract shortly thereafter.

After a stint in SG BBM Bietigheim that saw her winning the 2016-17 season of the Bundesliga where she became the league as well as the EHF Cup topscorer, she eventually moved back to the Danish league for the 2018–19 season to play for Silkeborg-Voel KFUM.

National team
Müller was part of the German youth setup since the youngest age categories. In youth handball, she achieved her biggest success in 2008 when she won the Junior World Championship in Macedonia. With seven goals she was the top scorer of the German team in the final, that stunned favorite Denmark 23–22.

In 2006, she was already selected in the wider 24-man squad for the European Championship by head coach Armin Emrich, but she was eventually left out from the travelling squad. Müller finally made her full international debut on 18 October 2007 against Japan. She made it to the German team for the 2007 World Championship; she played six matches at the tournament, scoring two goals and winning the bronze medal. A year later, Müller decided not to participate at the 2008 European Championship, claiming she needs a break after a long and exhausting three-years period behind her.

Müller was back in the German squad for the 2009 World Championship held in China; Germany finished seventh and, with 34 goals, Müller was the second-best scorer of the team behind Franziska Mietzner. Müller and Germany went to the 2010 European Women's Handball Championship with medal hopes, however, they suffered a surprise early exit after the group stage.

Müller missed the 2011 World Championship and the 2012 European Championship due to injuries, however, she returned at the 2013 World Championship in great form – with 62 goals she became the top scorer of the tournament and was further elected to the All-Star team. Germany eventually finished seventh at the championship.

Personal life
Müller is married to fellow handball player and former teammate, Nina Wörz.

Achievements

Club
EHF Cup:
Runner-up: 2008-9, 2016–17
Bundesliga:
Winner: 2009, 2010, 2017
DHB-Pokal:
Winner: 2007, 2008, 2014
DHB-Supercup:
Winner: 2008
Damehåndboldligaen:
Winner: 2012
Slovenian First League of Handball:
Winner: 2013
Slovenian Cup:
Winner: 2013

National team
World Championship:
Bronze Medalist: 2007
Junior World Championship:
Winner: 2008

Individual awards
 World Championship Top Scorer: 2013
 All-Star Right Back of the World Championship: 2013
 German Handballer of the Year: 2013
 EHF Cup Top Scorer: 2017
 HTH Ligaen's Player of the Month: April 2019

References

External links

German female handball players
1988 births
Living people
People from Saalfeld
Expatriate handball players
German expatriate sportspeople in Denmark
German expatriate sportspeople in Hungary
German expatriate sportspeople in Slovenia
Győri Audi ETO KC players
German LGBT sportspeople
LGBT handball players
Lesbian sportswomen
Sportspeople from Thuringia